Crítica da Faculdade do Cu (Portuguese for "Critique of the Power of the Ass") is the fifteenth studio album by the Brazilian musician Rogério Skylab, the final installment of the "Trilogia do Cu" ("Trilogy of the Ass"). Totaling 17 tracks, it is the longest album of the trilogy, and was self-described by Skylab as "one of [his] most complex and weirdest works". Released on December 20, 2019, it is available for free download on the musician's official website and for streaming in platforms such as Spotify and the iTunes Store. Its title is a pun on Immanuel Kant's 1790 philosophical treatise Critique of the Power of Judgment.

The album and the trilogy it is part of as a whole were originally announced by Skylab on his official Facebook page on March 7, 2018. In an August 2019 interview, the musician stated that the album was in post-production stage and originally slated for an early January 2020 release. As was the case of its predecessor, Lívio Tragtenberg provided the pre-mixing and samples for the album, in his fifth collaboration overall with Skylab.

Guest musicians include Vovô Bebê (guitar and backing vocals in "Homo sacer") and funk carioca singer MC Gorila (vocals and co-author of "Cabecinha"). "A Marchinha Psicótica de Dr. Soup" is a cover of the song by Jupiter Apple, and his third cover by Skylab following "Na Casa de Mamãe" (off Skygirls) and "Eu e Minha Ex" (off Trilogia dos Carnavais: 25 Anos de Carreira ou de Lápide). "Tem Cigarro Aí?" was re-recorded from Skylab's 2009 collaborative album with Zumbi do Mato bassist Zé Felipe, Rogério Skylab & Orquestra Zé Felipe. "Boceta Bradesco" had its title famously inspired by a tweet made by YouTuber Pirula.

"Caetano de Dedé" references in its title musician Caetano Veloso and his first wife, Andréa "Dedé" Gadelha.

Track listing

Personnel
 Rogério Skylab – vocals, backing vocals (track 9), production
 Vovô Bebê – classical guitar, backing vocals (track 4)
 MC Gorila – lead vocals (track 9)
 Thiago Martins – electric guitar
 Yves Aworet – bass guitar
 Alex Curi – drums
 Lívio Tragtenberg – pre-mixing, sampling
 Vânius Marques – mixing, mastering
 Solange Venturi – photography
 Carlos Mancuso – cover art

References

2019 albums
Rogério Skylab albums
Self-released albums
Sequel albums
Albums free for download by copyright owner